Shah Zaib (born 18 April 1995) is an Afghan cricketer. He made his first-class debut for Boost Region in the 2017–18 Ahmad Shah Abdali 4-day Tournament on 7 November 2017.

References

External links
 

1995 births
Living people
Afghan cricketers
Boost Defenders cricketers
Place of birth missing (living people)